Shahran is a neighbourhood in north-west Tehran, Iran.

The area has been formed by a combination of old traditional homes and newly constructed apartments and has been grown rapidly.  One of the most important highways that is joint north-west and north-east regions of Tehran is divided the neighbourhood into two parts.

Shahran has been located at the beginning of an old road toward Sulqan and Sangan; two beautiful mountainous villages with high potentials for being natural tourist sites.  The road also connects Tehran to Imamzadeh Davood ; a holy village that is famous because of a shrine belong to a religious Shiite Muslim with the same name. Also the highway between Tehran and North Provinces of Iran (on the coast of Caspian Sea) will start from this area.  It is now under construction. Shahran has been located in the east of the Kan District; a large old village now is a part of Tehran City and still is also an independent district of Tehran governorship.

Gallery

References 

Neighbourhoods in Tehran